Eugnosta hypsitropha is a species of moth of the family Tortricidae. It is found in the Ruwenzori Mountains in Uganda.

References

Endemic fauna of Uganda
Moths described in 1965
Eugnosta